Sous le même toit ( Under the Same Roof) is a 2017 French comedy film directed by Dominique Farrugia.

Plot
It tells the story of a divorced couple whose husband does not find an apartment. He will finally see his former wife, saying "I have 20% of the apartment so you redeem it, or I just live in my 20%".

Cast
 Louise Bourgoin as Delphine Parisot
 Gilles Lellouche as Yvan Hazan
 Adèle Castillon as Violette Hazan
 Kolia Abiteboul as Lucas Hazan
 Marilou Berry as Melissa
 Manu Payet as Nico
 Julien Boisselier as William
 Marie-Anne Chazel
 Nicole Calfan
 Katia Tchenko as Chantal
 Lionel Abelanski
 Dominique Farrugia
 Claire-Lise Lecerf as Auore

References

External links
 

2017 films
2017 comedy films
2010s French-language films
French comedy films
Films set in the 2010s
2010s French films